Isakovo is a rural locality (a village) in Novlenskoye Rural Settlement, Vologodsky District, Vologda Oblast, Russia. The population was 2 as of 2002.

Geography 
The distance to Vologda is 75 km, to Novlenskoye is 9 km. Avdeyevo, Bubyrevo, Bobelevo, Bryukhachevo are the nearest rural localities.

References 

Rural localities in Vologodsky District